The 1997 Challenge Bell was a tennis tournament played on indoor carpet courts at the Club Avantage Multi-Sports in Quebec City in Canada that was part of Tier III of the 1997 WTA Tour. It was the 5th edition of the Challenge Bell, and was held from October 20 through October 26, 1997. Brenda Schultz-McCarthy won the singles title for the second time of her career.

Champions

Singles

 Brenda Schultz-McCarthy def.  Dominique Van Roost, 6–4, 6–7(4–7), 7–5
It was Schultz-McCarthy's only title of the year and the 16th of her career.

Doubles

 Lisa Raymond /  Rennae Stubbs def.  Alexandra Fusai /  Nathalie Tauziat, 6–4, 5–7, 7–5
It was Raymond's 1st title of the year and the 7th of her career. It was Stubbs' 1st title of the year and the 12th of her career.

External links
Official website

Challenge Bell
Tournoi de Québec
Challenge Bell
1990s in Quebec City